Euacidalia oroandes  is a moth in the family Geometridae first described by Herbert Druce in 1893. It is found in Guatemala and Panama.

The forewings and hindwings are pale pinkish brown, but paler at the base. The forewings have two spots on the costal margin and a row of small spots crossing beyond the middle dark brown. There is a pale submarginal waved line extending from near the apex to the anal angle. The hindwings are crossed by a row of dark brown spots, and a submarginal pale line.

References

Moths described in 1893
Sterrhini